The R127 and R134  are New York City Subway cars purpose-built by Kawasaki Heavy Industries in Kobe, Japan for work train service. The ten R127s were built in 1990–1991 while the eight R134s were built in 1994–1996.

The cars were built to the specifications of the subway's A Division (numbered routes), which are slightly narrower than those of the B Division (lettered routes), and are similar to the R62 and R62A passenger cars used on the A Division. However, they can be found on either division and are used as garbage train motors. They are not air-conditioned and instead have axiflow fans, resulting in these cars frequently replaced by air-conditioned passenger cars used on garbage trains in summer.

The ten R127s are numbered EP001 to EP010, while the eight R134s are numbered EP011 to EP018. The two types are essentially identical to each other, with only a few cosmetic differences.

References

External links
TheJoeKorner roster
NYCSubway.org

Train-related introductions in 1990
Train-related introductions in 1994
New York City Subway rolling stock
Kawasaki multiple units
1990 in rail transport
1994 in rail transport